Kirnberger temperament is an irregular temperament developed in the second half of the 18th century by Johann Kirnberger. Kirnberger was a student of Johann Sebastian Bach, held great admiration for his teacher and was one of his principal proponents.

The first Kirnberger temperament, "Kirnberger I", had similarities to Pythagorean temperament, which stressed the importance of perfect fifths all throughout the circle of fifths. A complete circle of perfect fifths is not possible, because when the circle comes to an end at the tone it began, it will have overshot its original pitch. Thus, if one tunes C–G, G–D, D–A, A–E, E–B, B–F, F–C, C–G (A), A–E, E–B, B–F, F–C … the new "C" will not be the same frequency as the first. The two "C"s will have a discrepancy of about 23 cents (a comma), which would be unacceptable. This difference between the initial "c" and final "c" that is derived from performing a series of perfect tunings is generally referred to as the Pythagorean comma. In Kirnberger I, the D–A fifth is reduced by a syntonic comma, making the major thirds F–A, C–E, G–B, and D–F# pure, though the fifth based on D is a ratio of 40/27 instead of 3/2. Many tuning systems have been developed to "spread around" that comma, that is, to divide that anomalous musical space among the other intervals of the scale.

Practical Temperaments: Kirnberger II

Kirnberger's first method of compensating for and closing the circle of fifths was to split the "wolf" interval, known to those who have used meantone temperaments, in half between two different fifths. That is, to compensate for the one extra comma, he removed half a comma from two of the formerly perfect fifths in order to complete the circle. In so doing, he allowed the remaining fifths to stay pure. At the time, however, pure thirds were more valued than pure fifths (meantone temperament had eight pure thirds and sacrificed four entire chords to achieve this end.) So, Kirnberger allowed for three pure thirds, the rest being slightly wide and the worst being three Pythagorean thirds (22 cents wider than pure) on the opposite end of the circle from the pure thirds. To put it graphically:

 C-----G-----D------A-----E-----B-----F#-----C#-----Ab(G#)-----Eb-----Bb-----F-----C 
   p      p   −1/2   −1/2   p     p      p      p          p      p      p     p
 |__pure 3rd__|
      |__pure 3rd__|
             |___pure 3rd|
                               |__Pythag. 3rd_|
                                      |_Pythag. 3rd___|
                                             |Pythag. 3rd___|     

The above table represents Kirnberger II temperament. The first row under the intervals shows 
either a "p" for pure, or "−1/2" for those intervals narrowed to close the circle of fifths (D–A), (A–E). Below these are shown the pure 3rds (between C–E, G–B, D–F), and Pythagorean (very wide) 3rds (B–D, F–A(B), D–F.)

Temperament, however, is a give-and-take situation: none is a perfect solution. It must also be remembered that temperament applies only to instruments with fixed pitch: any keyboard instrument, lutes, viols, and so forth. Wind musicians, singers and string players all have a certain degree of flexibility concerning the exact pitch and intonation of what they play and may therefore be free of such restrictive systems. When the two classes of players come together, it is important when evaluating a temperament to consider the tendencies of the instruments vs. those of the temperament. Kirnberger II would only have been applicable to keyboard instruments such as the harpsichord and organ. The advantages of this system are its three pure major thirds and its ten pure fifths; the disadvantages are, of course, the two narrow "half-wolf" fifths and the three Pythagorean, super-wide thirds. The chords are not unusable but certainly must not be used frequently or in close succession within the course of a piece.

Kirnberger III

After some disappointment with his sour, narrow fifths, Kirnberger experimented further and developed another possibility, later named the Kirnberger III. 

This temperament splits the Syntonic comma between four fifths instead of two. 1/4-comma tempered fifths are used extensively in meantone and are much easier to tune and to listen to. This also eliminates two of the three pure thirds found in Kirnberger II. Therefore, only one third remains pure (between C and E), and there are fewer Pythagorean thirds. A greater middle ground is thus reached in this improvement, and each key is closer to being equal to the next. The drawback is an aesthetic one: fewer chords have pure thirds and fifths. But every temperament system has a give-and-take compromise; each has to find a way of dealing with the comma.

See also
Friedrich Wilhelm Marpurg
Construction der gleichschwebenden Temperatur

Further reading
Klop, G.C. (1974) Harpsichord Tuning. The Sunbury Press, Raleigh, N.C. Designated "Kirnberger 2" and presumably other Kirnberger temperaments.
 Willem Kroesbergen, Andrew Cruickshank "18th century quotes on J.S. Bach's Temperament (2014) https://www.academia.edu/5210832/18th_Century_Quotes_on_J.S._Bach_s_Temperament
 Dominic Eckersley "Rosetta Revisited" https://dominiceckersley.files.wordpress.com/2013/04/rosetta_revisited.pdf

Sources

Musical temperaments